Dylan Harvey Aluli Teves (born May 14, 2000) is an American professional soccer player who plays as a midfielder for Seattle Sounders FC in Major League Soccer.

Career
Teves was part of the Seattle Sounders FC academy, and appeared for their USL affiliate side Seattle Sounders FC 2 during their 2017 and 2018 seasons.

College
Teves joined the college soccer program at the University of Washington later in 2018.
While a freshman at Washington, Teves began a regular starter for the Huskies halfway through the 2018 NCAA Division I men's soccer season. Teves scored his first goal for Washington on August 30, 2018, in a 2-3 loss to the Denver Pioneers. At the end of the 2018 Pac-12 Conference men's soccer season, Teves was named third-team All-Pac-12.

During Teves' junior season, he was named an All-American by United Soccer Coaches, and was one of five players in the nation to be named a consensus All-American.

Professional
On January 11, 2022, Teves signed a contract with the Sounders as a Homegrown Player.

References

External links

U.S. Soccer Development Academy bio (Seattle Sounders FC)

Dylan Teves at University of Washington

2000 births
Living people
All-American men's college soccer players
American soccer players
Tacoma Defiance players
Washington Huskies men's soccer players
Seattle Sounders FC U-23 players
Association football midfielders
Soccer players from Honolulu
Soccer players from Washington (state)
USL Championship players
USL League Two players
People from Renton, Washington
Seattle Sounders FC players
Homegrown Players (MLS)
MLS Next Pro players
Major League Soccer players